Torstein Moland (born 4 November 1945) is a Norwegian economist.

From 1986 to 1989, during the second cabinet Brundtland, Moland was a state secretary in the Office of the Prime Minister.

He was then CEO of Norske Skog from 1990 to 1993, and was appointed Governor of the Central Bank of Norway in 1994. He was pressured to resign already in 1995 following the Airbus scandal. Instead, he was hired in Telenor.

References

1945 births
Living people
Governors of the Central Bank of Norway
Norske Skog people
Norwegian economists
Norwegian state secretaries
Labour Party (Norway) politicians